Vice Admiral E. O. Owusu-Ansah is a Ghanaian naval personnel and served in the Ghana Navy. He served as Chief of Naval Staff of the Ghana Navy from October 1996 to  March 2001.

References

Ghanaian military personnel
Ghana Navy personnel
Chiefs of Naval Staff (Ghana)
National Defence College, India alumni